Laura Dianti (Early sixteenth century in Ferrara – 25 June 1573 in Ferrara, Italy) was a lover of Alfonso I d'Este, Duke of Ferrara after the death of his wife Lucrezia Borgia. She was probably also his third wife. She was also known under the pseudonym Eustochia.

References

1480s births
1573 deaths
16th-century Italian women
Laura
Mistresses of Italian royalty
Renaissance women